The team dressage equestrian event at the 2011 Pan American Games was held on October 16 at the Guadalajara Country Club in Guadalajara. The defending Pan American champion is Lauren Samms (on Sagacious HF), Katherine Poulin-Neff (on Brilliant too) and Christopher Hickey (on Regent) of the United States.

The United States won its record fourth straight team dressage title, while with the second and third-place finishes Canada and Colombia qualify a full dressage team to compete at the 2012 Summer Olympics in London, Great Britain (the United States has already qualified).

Schedule
All times are Central Standard Time (UTC-6).

Results
47 competitors from 12 nations competed. 

# - Rider's score not counted in team total
* - Named to team but did not compete

References

Equestrian at the 2011 Pan American Games